The men's sabre was a fencing event held as part of the fencing at the 1904 Summer Olympics programme. It was the third time the event was held at the Olympics. 5 fencers from 2 nations competed. The competition was held on Thursday, September 8, 1904. The event was won by Manuel Díaz of Cuba. American William Grebe took second. American Albertson Van Zo Post earned bronze.

Background

This was the third appearance of the event, which is the only fencing event to have been held at every Summer Olympics. Albertson Van Zo Post had been the U.S. champion for three years. Manuel Díaz was a Cuban fencer who had attended Harvard College.

Both Cuba and the United States made their debut in the men's sabre. None of the nations that had competed in 1896 or 1900 entered the 1904 sabre competition.

Competition format

The event used a single pool-play final format. Standard sabre rules were used; unlike the previous two Games, the target area was limited to above the waist. Bouts were to 7 touches.

Schedule

Results

Sources

 

Fencing at the 1904 Summer Olympics